Protection Island may refer to:
Protection Island (Nanaimo) an island near Nanaimo, BC, Canada
Protection Island (Washington state), an island north of Discovery Bay, Wa, USA